Ibrahim Al-Zubaidi (Arabic: ابراهيم الزبيدي) is a Saudi Arabian professional footballer who plays as a left back for Al-Ahli.

Career
Al-Zubaidi started his career at Al-Wehda and played in the club's youth team. He made his debut for the first team during the 2009–10 season. On 17 June 2012, he signed a pre-contract agreement with Al-Nassr. He officially joined Al-Nassr in January 2013. On 7 January 2016, Al-Zubaidi left Al-Nassr and joined Najran. Following Najran's relegation to the First Division at the end of the 2015–16 season, Al-Zubaidi left the club and signed a 3-year contract with Al-Taawoun. On 19 December 2018, Al-Zubaidi renewed his contract with Al-Taawoun until 2021. On 26 July 2021, Al-Zubaidi joined newly promoted Pro League side Al-Tai. On 18 July 2022, Al-Zubaidi joined Al-Ahli.

Honours
Al-Nassr
Pro League: 2013–14, 2014–15
Crown Prince Cup: 2013–14

Al-Taawoun
King Cup: 2019

References

Living people
Saudi Arabian footballers
1989 births
Al-Wehda Club (Mecca) players
Al Nassr FC players
Najran SC players
Al-Taawoun FC players
Al-Tai FC players
Al-Ahli Saudi FC players
Saudi First Division League players
Saudi Professional League players
People from Mecca
Association football fullbacks